is a video game series spin-off from the main Pokémon series developed by Spike Chunsoft (formerly Chunsoft). The games feature the fictional creatures called Pokémon who have the ability to speak human language navigating through a randomly generated dungeon using turn-based moves, indicative of Mystery Dungeon games. , there have been eleven games across five platforms, as well as several manga adaptations and animated specials.

These games are based in dungeons (“mystery dungeons”) where a floor map is randomly generated. In the dungeons, players fight other Pokémon while obtaining items and finding stairs to the next floor, exiting the dungeon after a fixed number of floors. Across all installments, the series has sold over 17.15 million copies.

Gameplay 

Although there are different features in each of the titles, the major aspects of gameplay in each title are the same. The player assumes the role of a Pokémon that was transformed from a human, found by the player's Pokémon partner in the start of the game. Before the game starts, the player will need to go through a personality test; this will decide which Pokémon the player is in the game with the exception of the WiiWare games and Pokémon Mystery Dungeon: Gates to Infinity, where the player may choose their starter. In Pokémon Super Mystery Dungeon and Pokémon Mystery Dungeon: Rescue Team DX, one can choose a Pokemon to be after the personality test. Gameplay is based on a classic roguelike game, with the player navigating the randomly generated dungeon with their Pokémon team. Movement and actions are turn-based; the player can use basic attacks, Pokémon moves, and items. The game starts with one partner Pokémon, but the player can recruit other Pokémon that they meet in the dungeon into their team soon after the first mission.

Development 
Tsunekazu Ishihara has worked previously with Chunsoft. One of the company's work was Tetris 2 + Bombliss, where Ishihara was the game's producer and met Koichi Nakamura, who was the game's director. Prior to the development of Pokémon Mystery Dungeon: Red Rescue Team and Blue Rescue Team, Ishihara has played a few games from the Mystery Dungeon series, namely Torneko no Daibōken: Fushigi no Dungeon, and was impressed with the genre's depth and quality. The game's development started after Seiichiro Nagahata and Shin-ichiro Tomie approached Ishihara and agreed with working on an easier version of the genre for the mainline Pokémon fans. During the development of Red and Blue Rescue Team, Kouji Maruta, one of the programmer for these two games, and contributed previously on EarthBound and Shiren the Wanderer 2: Oni Invasion! Shiren Castle!, stated the company went through bad business performance, as employees from Chunsoft would leave the company progressively due to this issue. The game's success not only helped to give more popularity to the franchise, it also helped Chunsoft avoid bankruptcy.

Games 

The games are developed by Spike Chunsoft, formerly Chunsoft before the merging in 2012, and published by Nintendo and The Pokémon Company.

The first game released in the series was Pokémon Mystery Dungeon: Blue Rescue Team and Red Rescue Team in 2005 in Japan, then worldwide in 2006. The duo were released on two separate platforms; Red Rescue Team for Game Boy Advance; Blue Rescue Team for Nintendo DS. Two years later, Pokémon Mystery Dungeon: Explorers of Time and Explorers of Darkness for Nintendo DS were released in 2007 in Japan, then worldwide in 2008. Starting from Pokémon Mystery Dungeon: Explorers of Sky in 2009, the sister game and enhanced remake of Explorers of Time and Darkness, the series would not be released in Taiwan and South Korea. Additionally, due to a production shortage, Explorers of Sky had limited circulation throughout Australia. Most retailers in Australia stocked UK-imported versions. Shortly after the release of Explorers of Sky in Japan, the Pokémon Mystery Dungeon: Adventure Squad titles were released for the WiiWare exclusively in Japan. As such, they are the first and only Pokémon Mystery Dungeon games to never be released overseas. They were initially revealed as logos on pamphlets given out at McDonald's. These games utilize the 3D models from Pokémon Rumble and My Pokémon Ranch, making them the first games to use models instead of 2D sprites. This was done in an attempt to make "something that resembles a picture book". The three different versions have various differences, like starting points and initial Pokémon choices. There is a rescue feature where players can request for friends to revive their team. By using WiiConnect24, new missions are added to the game while the Wii is asleep, and players can share save data throughout all three games. In 2012, Pokémon Mystery Dungeon: Gates to Infinity was released for the Nintendo 3DS in Japan, before being released worldwide in 2013. From there on, the series use purpose-made 3D models, as opposed to 2D sprites or 3D models from other spin-off titles. Pokémon Super Mystery Dungeon is the latest non-remake release in the series, released in 2015 on Nintendo 3DS, then in 2016 in PAL regions. Finally, Pokémon Mystery Dungeon: Rescue Team DX is the latest title in the series, simultaneously on Nintendo Switch in 2020. It is a remake of the original Rescue Team games on Nintendo DS and Game Boy Advance, united as one game, with a complete overhaul of the graphics and reworked gameplay.

Comics 
Manga adaptations of the series were made throughout the years.
Pokémon Mystery Dungeon: Ginji's Rescue Team, a manga adaption of Pokémon Mystery Dungeon: Blue Rescue Team and Red Rescue Team.
Pokémon Mystery Dungeon: Blazing Exploration Team, a manga adaption of Pokémon Mystery Dungeon: Explorers of Time, Explorers of Darkness, and Explorers of Sky.
Pokémon Super Mystery Dungeon: Go For It! Novice Investigation Team!, a manga adaption of Pokémon Super Mystery Dungeon.

Notes
 5.85 million copies sold from the Rescue Team titles, 6.37 million copies sold from the Explorers titles, 1.38 million copies sold from Gates to Infinity, 1.66 million copies sold from Super Mystery Dungeon, and 1.89 million copies sold from Rescue Team DX.

References 

 
Nintendo franchises
Kadokawa Dwango franchises
Role-playing video games
Tactical role-playing video games
Video game franchises
Video game franchises introduced in 2005
Roguelike video games
Portal fantasy